Areniscythris is a genus of moths in the family Scythrididae.

Species
 Areniscythris brachypteris Powell, 1976
 Areniscythris whitesands Metzler & Lightfoot, 2014

References

Scythrididae
Moth genera